The DL Chronicles is a gay-themed television series that debuted on American LGBT station here! in 2007 for one season that consisted of four episodes. It was revived in 2012 as "The DL Chronicles Returns".

Overview
The show's debut season focused on the stories of men who live secret lives. From a highly successful executive to the street corner hustler, from the happily married father of two, to the college athlete's first love, each episode, featuring a different cast, delved into the different lives and experiences of men living on the "down low".

Each episode features narration from Chadwick Williams (Damian Toofeek Raven), an aspiring journalist, as he pursues research while authoring a book about men who have sex with men (MSM). The series was created by filmmakers Quincy LeNear and Deondray Gossett who also serve as the producers and directors of the series.

The series has won numerous awards, including the GLAAD Media Award for Best Anthology Series in 2008. It has the added distinction of being both the first African American themed show and the first show produced by a cable network to win the award.

Episodes

Episode 1: Wes
Wes Thomas (Darren Schnase), an upwardly mobile real-estate banker, soon finds himself overwhelmed by the demands of his marriage, career, and closeted attraction to men. When Wes' sexy but ambivalent brother-in-law Trent Porter (Ty Vincent) stops in for an unexpected stay, he is faced with temptation and ultimately falls for the forbidden fruit.

Cast
Damian Toofeek Raven as Chadwick Williams
Darren Dupree Washington as Wes Thomas (credited as Darren Schnase)
Jessica Beshir as Sarah Thomas
Ty Vincent as Trent Porter
Maya Gilbert as Patricia Buford
R.J. Black as Charles Buford II
Holly Karrol Clark as Tanya Dubois
Phil Selvey as Rodney Dubois

Episode 2: Robert
Robert, a closeted talent agent (Terrell Tilford) falls for a much younger health food store manager named Austin (Kareem Ferguson). What Robert fails to share is that he has a daughter, Rhonda Hall (Toyin Moses) who doesn't know that her father is gay. While on a daddy/daughter date they run into Austin who pretends to be Robert's client. Rhonda is no fool. She goes to the health store and confronts Austin. He tells her the truth about the nature of their relationship. Robert blames Austin for outing him.  Their relationship ends after Robert slings homophobic slurs at Austin. Robert and his daughter sit down for a long overdue discussion and eventually he receives his daughter's understanding. He realizes that ending his relationship with Austin was a huge mistake. With honest and touching words, he wins Austin back.

Cast
Damian Toofeek Raven as Chadwick Williams
Terrell Tilford as Robert Hall
Kareem Ferguson as Austin
Toyin Moses as Rhonda Hall
Sheilynn Wactor as Shirley
Jason Stuart as Sassy Customer
Karamo Brown as Agent #1
Paul Jerome as Agent #2 (credited as Paul Eric Jerome)
Ty Vincent as Trent Porter (in a photo)

Episode 3: Boo
Boo (Oneil Cespedes) is an ex-convict, a mooch, and a player who lives his life on the DL. His girlfriend Kesha (Latoya Haynes) is fed up with Boo's cheating and kicks him to the curb. Boo's mother (Irene Amen) tells him it's time to settle down, but Boo is unfazed and continues having sex with multiple partners, including an unprotected romp with Deron (Anthony Clark), his neighborhood friend. But when shocking news rattles Boo, he is forced to reconsider his reckless life on the DL.

Cast
Damian Toofeek Raven as Chadwick Williams
Oneil Cespedes as Boo
Latoya Haynes as Keisha
Anthony Clark as Deron
Irene Amen as Mama
Sheilynn Wactor as Shirley
Clifton Morris as Tony
T. Ashanti Mozelle as Jesse
Brandon McKinnie as Kyle
Cherie Price as Nikka
Shawn Palm as Naked Man
Sydelle Noel as Other Woman (credited as Sydelle Granger)

Episode 4: Mark
Mark (Ulrich Que) and Donte (Colbert Alembert), a loving couple who have been living on the DL, are jolted by the unexpected arrival of Mark’s thuggish cousin, Terrell (Ace Gibson), who shows up at their house needing a place to crash. Desperate to keep their relationship a secret, Mark asks his boyfriend to pretend he's straight. When Dante reluctantly agrees to play the part of Mark's "roommate" for their new houseguest, a chain of humorous events unfolds, and Mark eventually comes to realize the ridiculous nature of living on the DL in their own home.
Cast
Damian Toofeek Raven as Chadwick Williams
Ulrich Que as Mark Watts
Colbert Alembert as Donte
Ace Gibson as Terrell Wiggins (credited as Dee Gibson)
Monte Franks as Reginald Stokes
Craig Davidson as Bartender
Tamiko K. Brooks as Nosey Neighbor
Chuanda Mason as Pretty woman in bar
T. Ashanti Mozelle as Jesse

2012 Revival (The DL Chronicles Returns)

Episode 5: Thomas
Thomas, a former New York City firefighter, falls in love with a stranger who unexpectedly comes into his life to assist him after facing a tragic event.
Cast
Damian Toofeek Raven as Chadwick Williams
Gabriel Corbin as Thomas Gavin
Colbert Alembert as Dante
Johanny Paulino as Steven Nevins
DeLaRosa Rivera as Columbus

References

External links

2000s American LGBT-related drama television series
Here TV original programming
LGBT African-American culture